Weave and Spin is the first album by folk trio Lady Maisery

Review

Lady Maisery, best known for creating a stunning vocal harmony by way of their songs and ballads, won the nomination for the "Horizon" BBC Radio 2 Folk Award 2012 along with the "Best Debut" at the Spiral Awards 2012.
It was the trio's 2011 debut album, "Weave and Spin" that launched them with a considerable feedback inviting favorable reviews from the daily, The Independent, which rated it as an "Album of the Week". Lady Maisery are successful in reviving the almost forgotten " diddling or tune singing" so native to English music, which is still practiced in Scandinavia and Europe. The trio's talent always shines both when singing unaccompanied or with music to back them played brilliantly by them on accordion, harp, fiddle, and bansitar.

Track listing

Personnel

Hazel Askew (vocals, harp)
Hannah James (vocals, piano accordion, clogs)
Rowan Rheingans (vocals, fiddle, banjo, bansitar).

References

2011 albums